Laine Selwyn (born May 16, 1981) is an American professional women's basketball player with Maccabi Ashdod (women's basketball). A guard, who has played previously in the WNBA and professionally on multiple teams throughout Europe and Israel, she was a former standout for the University of Pittsburgh's women's basketball team from 1999 to 2003.

Early years
Selwyn, the daughter of Bill and Faye Selwyn, averaged 21.5 points per game, 7.8 rebounds per game, 6.3 assists per game, and 4.1 steals per game at Coral Springs High School in Florida. Selwyn was named the Miami Herald and Fort Lauderdale Sun Sentinel Girls Basketball Player of the Year as a senior in 1998–99. She also was a USA Today All-U.S.A. Basketball honorable mention in 1997–98 and 1998–99. Selwyn earned 6A first team all-state honors in 1998–99 and second-team honors in 1997–98. As a senior, she was the runner-up for 6A Player of the Year honors. Selwyn was a four-time letter winner in basketball but also earned one letter each in volleyball and softball.

University of Pittsburgh
Only player in Pittsburgh history to collect over 1,000 pts, 400 rebs and 400 assists
Only player to record a triple double in Pittsburgh, she did it twice

2002–03: Honored by the Jewish Sports Hall of Fame as their recipient of the Marty Glickman Outstanding Jewish Scholastic Athlete of the Year, she led the Panthers in scoring (16.5), rebounding (6.2), assists (5.9) and steals (3.0) for the second year in a row as a senior...a Third Team All-Big East Conference honoree, she was named the Big East Player of the Week three times in her career and recorded the only two triple-doubles in the program's history…she left Pittsburgh in possession of three school records and ranked among the top 10 on three different career lists…she scored in double figures in all but two games during the season…she scored a season-high 27 points at Syracuse, 3/1, and scored 20 or more points nine times…she notched her second triple-double with 11 points, 10 rebounds and a season-high 14 assists vs. Norfolk State, 12/29…her 5.9 apg ranked third-best in the Big East and 27th nationally…she was second in the conference in steals per game and she tied for 28th in the country in that department…she finished third on the school's all-time chart with 232 steals, and fourth in assists with 530…she also ranked eighth on Pittsburgh's all-time scoring list with 1,344 points and became the only player in Panthers' history to record 1,000 points, 400 assists and 400 rebounds in her career. 2001–02: The first player in Pittsburgh history to record a triple-double, she had 12 points, a season-high 11 rebounds and 10 assists against St. John's 2/9…for the season, she led the Panthers in scoring (14.6 ppg), assists (5.9 apg) and steals (2.48 spg)…her career-high 16 assists vs. St. Francis, 12/30, tied a school record…in the season finale at Providence, 2/26, she scored a career-high 32 points…she had a team-high 67 steals and ranked among the Big East's best with an average of 2.48 spg. 2000–01: She took over as the Panthers' starting point guard as a sophomore, starting all but two games...second on the team with 11.4 points per game, she ranked among the Big East leaders in assists, steals, free throw percentage and assist-turnover ratio...she had single-game career highs in every category...she set a school record for field goal percentage against a Big East opponent, shooting 81.8 percent (9-of-11) at Syracuse (Jan. 6). 1999-00: She gained valuable experience during her freshman campaign, sharing the duties at point guard...she played in every game and earned 11 consecutive starts from Dec. 4 through Feb. 12...for the season, she averaged 6.3 points and was second on the team with 2.9 assists per game...she was selected to play on the Big East All-Star Tour of Canada during the summer between her freshman and sophomore seasons…she was Pittsburgh's top free-throw shooter in Big East games, connecting on 31–35 shots (.886)...she netted her first 20-point game with 21 points against Georgetown. In 2003, she joined the National Jewish Sports Hall of Fame and Museum.

Pittsburgh  statistics
Source

Professional career
Israeli league assist leader in 04/05 with 4.9 APG
Israeli Cup winner in 04/05 with Anda Ramat Hasharon
Won championship & cup with Ramla in 06/07
Led all Israelis in assists in 07/08 with 4.4 APG (3rd overall)
Won Israeli Championship & Cup with Elizur Ramla in 07/08
Won the Cup & Championship with Ramat Hasharon in 09/10
2010–2011: Won the Israeli Cup and Championship...also won the gold in the EURO-CUP. 2009–2010:Won the Israeli Cup and Championship
2008–2009: Won the championship with Ramat Hasharon after leaving the Russian club Dynamo Moscow.
2007–08: Playing in 20 of her team's 21 games in the Israeli Basketball League, she led Elizur Ramla with 4.5 apg and 2.0 spg…she ranked third in the league in assists and 13th in steals…she also averaged 10.8 ppg and tied for the team lead with 22 3-pt field goals made…in 14 EuroCup games, she averaged 10.0 ppg, 4.4 rpg, 3.9 apg and 2.2 spg. 2006–07: In 23 Israeli League games, Selwyn averaged 9.2 ppg, 3.8 rpg and was third in the league with a team-high 4.7 apg…in three games for the Israeli National Team during the European Championships in Italy, she averaged 6.0 ppg, 4.7 rpg and 3.3 apg. *2005–06: Playing for Besiktas Istanbul in Turkey, she helped lead her team to a second-place finish in the regular season and to a place in the league finals by averaging 6.9 ppg, 3.6 rpg, 2.1 apg and 1.4 spg…she shot 38 percent from behind the 3-pt line. 2004–05: In her first professional season, she played 22 games for Anda Ramat Hasharon, where she led the Israeli League in assists with an average of 4.9 apg…she also averaged 10.2 ppg, 4.9 rpg and 1.6…in 11 EuroCup games, she averaged 5.0 rpg, while scoring 7.8 ppg and handing out 3.7 apg…in those games, she shot 52 percent from 2-pt range and nearly 54 percent (.538) from behind the 3-pt arc.
2013–14: played for Ramat HaSharon in the Israel D-1 league alongside Jacqui Kalin and Megan Frazee.

References

1981 births
Living people
American expatriate basketball people in Israel
American women's basketball players
Coral Springs High School alumni
Israeli women's basketball players
Pittsburgh Panthers women's basketball players
Point guards
Sportspeople from Coral Springs, Florida
American people of Jewish descent
Israeli people of American-Jewish descent
21st-century American Jews